Binagi is a ward in Tarime District, Mara Region of northern Tanzania, East Africa. In 2016 the Tanzania National Bureau of Statistics report there were 10,420 people in the ward, from 9,443 in 2012.

Villages / neighborhoods 
The ward has 3 villages and 21 hamlets.

 Nyamwigura
 Gwisana
 Ihitya
 Kemela
 Kesingaka
 Kwiriba
 Manyenya
 Masana
 Nyamatagito
 Senta
 ketoka
 Magoma
 Makonge
 Muhuru
 Nyamerenge
 Nyamesocho
 Nyatahania
 Senta
 Nyasaricho
 Buchora
 Bukonge
 Nyabahengere
 Nyamihuto
 Senta

References

Tarime District
Mara Region